Bitter End of a Sweet Night is a 1961 Japanese drama film directed by Yoshishige Yoshida.

Plot
Young shop clerk Jiro is eager to climb the social ladder, an aim for which he uses and manipulates everyone around him. He talks diner waitress Harumi into moving into his flat and introduces her to bar madam Soko, who pays him for his mediation. While Harumi is reluctant to Jiro's advances, she eventually agrees to Soko's plan to have refinery owner Hondo act as her patron and pay an apartment for her. Jiro has affairs both with Soko and Masae, the widowed daughter-in-law of foundry owner Oka, whom he intends to marry for her money. When Hondo buys Oka out of his heavily indebted company, Masae is left without any assets, and Jiro dumps her. After Harumi dies in a car accident with another lover, Jiro returns to Soko, who bluntly tells him that she will keep him simply as her gigolo and pet, to which he starts laughing hysterically.

Cast
 Masahiko Tsugawa as Jiro Tezuka
 Teruyo Yamagami as Harumi Nishimoto
 Sumiko Hidaka as Hisako Nishimoto, Harumi's mother
 Michiko Saga as Soko Mishima
 Jun Hamamura as Kenkichi Mishima, Soko's father
 Osamu Takizawa as Hondo
 Hiroko Sugita as Masae Oka
 Takamaru Sasaki as Tokusaburo Oka, Masae's father-in-law

Home media
Bitter End of a Sweet Night was released on DVD in 2013 as part of production company Shochiku's Yoshishige Yoshida DVD-Box Vol. 1.

References

External links

Bibliography
 

1961 films
1961 drama films
Japanese drama films
Japanese black-and-white films
Films directed by Yoshishige Yoshida
1960s Japanese films